Andrei Cristian Mirică (born 13 March 2001) is a Romanian professional footballer who plays as a midfielder for Liga III club Foresta Suceava.  In his career, Mirică also played for CSM Deva,  CS Sportul Snagov and FC Argeș Pitești.

Career Statistics

Club

References

External links
 
 

2001 births
Living people
Footballers from Bucharest
Romanian footballers
Association football midfielders
Liga I players
Liga II players
Liga III players
CSM Deva players
CS Sportul Snagov players
FC Argeș Pitești players
ACS Foresta Suceava players